The Metal Men are a group of superheroes that appear in DC Comics. The characters first appeared in Showcase #37 (March–April 1962) and were created by writer Robert Kanigher and artist Ross Andru. Debuting in the Silver Age of Comic Books, the characters have appeared in comic books and other DC Comics-related products such as animated television series, clothing, figurines and trading cards.

Publication history

1960s and 1970s
Established as advanced artificially intelligent robots, the Metal Men were introduced in the comic book Showcase #37 (March–April 1962) as "last minute" filler. Created by scientist Dr. William "Will" Magnus, the six robots were field leader Gold; strongman Iron; slow-witted and loyal Lead; hot-headed Mercury; self-doubting and insecure Tin; and Platinum (also called "Tina"), who believed that she was a real woman and was in love with her creator. The group's personalities mirrored their namesake metals, being dictated by devices called responsometers. Each Metal Man also possessed abilities that reflected the traits of their namesake metal: Gold could stretch his form almost infinitely, Iron was super-strong, Lead could block harmful radiation by morphing into thick shields, Mercury could melt and pass through small spaces before reforming, while Platinum and Tin could stretch, flatten or spin into fine filaments.

The characters reappeared in the following three issues of Showcase (#38–40, June–October 1962) and proved popular enough to warrant a reappearance in their own eponymous title. First published in May 1963, the title ran on a bi-monthly schedule with original stories until Metal Men #41 (December 1969). The comic was unusual for the time, for having continued serialized storylines across issues. A second female robot (created by Tin) was introduced in issue #13 (April–May 1965), and was later (issue #15, August–September 1965) christened as "Nameless", last appearing in issue #32. 

With sales dropping, the series' tone darkened with issue #33 (September 1968), as the cover tagline changed to "The New Hunted Metal Men". Shortly after, the team adopted human identities in issue #37 (May 1969). The title was cancelled in mid-story with issue #41 (December 1969).

Issues #42, 43 and 44 (March, May, and July 1973) reprinted earlier Showcase appearances and the first issue, with the title then on hiatus until returning with original numbering in issue #45 (May 1976). The bi-monthly publishing schedule continued until issue #56 (March 1978), when the title and many others were cancelled during the DC Implosion.

Until #21, the Metal Men appeared to be the sole super-heroes in a separate fictional universe, with no other DC Comics characters appearing (though the Metal Men watch a Batman television series, and Dr. Yes is recognized by them as resembling an enemy of Wonder Woman--Magnus and the Metal Men even seem to know at times that they are comic book characters, referring to earlier issues and reader response). Then the Metal Men became part of the shared universe of the DC heroes, even though they continued to fight their own foes (such as Chemo).

The Metal Men co-starred with other DC heroes such as Atom, Metamorpho and Batman in The Brave and the Bold #55 (September 1964), #66 (July 1966), #74 (November 1967), #103 (November 1972), #113 (July 1974), #121 (September 1975), #135–136 (July–September 1977) and #187 (June 1982). This trend was repeated with Superman in DC Comics Presents #4 (December 1978) and #70 (June 1984), and an appearance in Showcase #100 (May 1978).

1990s
The group returned in an eponymous four-issue limited series (Metal Men (vol. 2) #1–4 (October 1993 – January 1994)) that featured a retcon of the characters' origin story. A laboratory accident transfers the intellects and personalities of Doctor Magnus' brother Mike, his fiancée Sharon, laboratory workers Redmond Wilde and Randy Pressman, Thomas Tinkham and a pizza-delivery man named Jack to blank robots (Gold, Platinum, Mercury and Iron, Tin and Lead respectively). During a battle, Gold is killed and Doctor Magnus mortally wounded, being forced to transfer his personality into a robot known as Veridium. Magnus then becomes the leader of the Metal Men. Lead later makes a brief appearance as a worker at a superhero bar, and is temporarily damaged while protecting civilians. A robot Tungsten with no personality that served as a personal aide to Magnus was introduced in a guest appearance in The Doom Patrol; he was killed by a villain named the Candlemaker.

2000s
The Metal Men then reappeared during the Infinite Crisis storyline (Infinite Crisis #1–7, December 2005 – June 2006, Villains United #1–6, July–December 2005), battling the O.M.A.C. cyborgs and acting as part of a superhero strike force assembled to protect the city of Metropolis from the Secret Society of Super Villains. Several of the Metal Men appeared in Justice League of America (vol. 2) #1 (August 2006), with the events of the limited series eventually revised and presented as a delusion suffered by Doctor Magnus in 52, #22 (October 2006).

The entire group reappeared in Superman/Batman #34–36 (May, July–August 2007), having been rebuilt and upgraded and including a new female member, the sarcastic Copper. Employed by Lucius Fox as security for WayneTech, the Metal Men temporarily fall under the influence of Brainiac. The group starred in another eponymous limited series, running for eight issues (Metal Men (vol. 3) #1–8 October 2007 – June 2008). David Magnus, another brother of Will and Mike Magnus, attempts to avert a catastrophic future and prevent the creation of the group, and uses a device stolen from the villain T. O. Morrow to change the Metal Men into evil, radioactive versions based on other metals, called the Death Metal Men: Uranium (Iron), Strontium (Mercury), Thorium (Platinum), Radium (Gold), Lithium (Copper), Polonium (Lead), and Fermium (Tin). Doctor Magnus, however, is able to reverse the process and with the Metal Men and the assistance of the alien robot L-Ron, defeat his brother.

The Metal Men also featured in a stand-alone story in the weekly publication Wednesday Comics (#1–12, September–November 2009), and co-starred in the first seven issues of Doom Patrol (vol. 5, October 2009 – April 2010). This series was later reprinted in DC Comics Presents: Metal Men 100 Page Spectacular (2011).

The Metal Men appeared in Justice League: Generation Lost #10–11 (November–December 2010). Captured by villain Maxwell Lord, the Metal Men are reprogrammed and believe themselves to be humans living in a magical fantasy world. At Lord's behest, the brainwashed Metal Men attack the members of the new Justice League International (thinking them monsters), and merge into their alternate universe persona Alloy (from the limited series Kingdom Come (#1–4, May–August 1996)), but are eventually defeated.

2010s
In The New 52, a 2011 reboot of the DC Comics universe, the Metal Men were created by Doctor Magnus but subsequently disappeared. Cyborg locates Magnus and learns the scientist was tasked by the military with the creation of a rescue team that could enter toxic environments. Although successful, Magnus learns the military intends to use the Metal Men as assassins and the group flees and takes refuge in his apartment. When the entity Chemo is created (on account of a prototype responsometer created by Magnus being thrown into a vat of chemicals by a thief), the Metal Men fought Chemo to protect Will Magnus and the local population, and while successful are thought destroyed before eventually reappearing in an issue of Swamp Thing. During a run in with several other heroes, The Metal Men encountered three new Metal Men—Magnesium, Lithium and Silicon—who were created by the government in a plan to get the original Metal Men back in the military as assassins again. Despite their attempts' the three new robots are eventually destroyed in the conflict.

In the Watchmen sequel Doomsday Clock, the Metal Men are among the superheroes that head to Mars to confront Doctor Manhattan. Gold, Tin and Platinum are later seen as recruits of the League, to research a multi-verse ending threat.Justice League (vol. 4) #26 (2019) In 2016, a six-issue series called Legends of Tomorrow: The Metal Men played a big part in the series. They were in Nevada fighting off a robot enemy, and the government wanted to destroy the Metal Men and get rid of them as a threat to the people. 

The Metal Men were seen again in a 12-issue mini-series in 2019, with a new metal member to the team that was found at a construction site called for Magnus. The Metal Men were destroyed by Magnus for trying to rebuild them from scratch again, and again the new one saw a version of themself destroyed. Dr. Will Magnus just had enough of making the Metal Men, and he fell in love with a girl leaving the Metal Men to themselves after having flashbacks of how he made them to now. After getting the new metal they found in Magnus' lab he helped it out as it called his name. He introduced them to his Metal Man had made, and it became part of the team. The new member enjoyed talking to Platinum and he fell in love with her.

Team roster

While there have been a number of different Metal Men members over the course of their history, the original and most common team line-up is Gold, Iron, Lead, Mercury, Platinum, and Tin led by their creator/mentor, scientist Dr. Will Magnus. Occasionally, the roster includes Copper as well.

Enemies

Over the years the Metal Men have fought with a variety of villains such as Professor Bravo and his Plastic Perils, Vox The Bionic Bandit, Grid, The Chemical Monster Chemo, Missile Men,  Gas Gang, Darzz The Intergalactic Dictator, Radioactive Manta Ray Monster From Space, Alien Fly Monster Fferka, Volcano Man, Sizzler, Von Vroon etc. Many of the team's foes are fellow robots, aliens or other science-based villains.

Other versions
The Metal Men feature in a combined form called Alloy in the 1996 limited series Kingdom Come.

In the possible future depicted in Superman: The Man of Steel #1,000,000 (November 1998), Superman tracks down Platinum, one of the few individuals to have survived all the way into the future, to question her about the true history of current foe Solaris, reasoning that Platinum will have recorded all the data on Solaris but be able to relay it from a perspective that Superman can more easily comprehend.

In the alternate timeline of JLA: The Nail, in which Superman was never discovered by the Kents, the Metal Men appear to attack Wonder Woman after she is framed for the destruction of the White House. Their actions and her words suggest that they have been reprogrammed to act as more conventional robots despite existing as heroes in this world, with Wonder Woman pleading with them to recognize that she is not responsible for the attack and the Metal Men making such comments as 'Unit Tin requires assistance' and 'Unit Lead converting to Gun Mode'. In the end, Wonder Woman is forced to destroy the Metal Men with their own bullets as the ricochet off her bracelets damages her attackers. They reappear in the sequel, JLA: Another Nail, now showing their more characteristic demeanor, alongside Magnus as he analyzes the Amazo android before it is stolen by Star Sapphire, Black Orchid and Powergirl.

In the Tangent Comics book Metal Men #1 (December 1997) features a covert ops group called the "Metal Men" composed of six human operatives: leader Marcus Moore, Samuel Schwartz, Carl Walters, Rey Quinones, Francis Powell, and John Holliday.

The Metal Men of Earth-44 (robotic versions of the Justice League and led by "Doc Tornado" a human version of the android Red Tornado) feature in the limited series Final Crisis (#1–7, July 2008 – March 2009).

In the Batman Beyond comics that share the DCAU continuity, The Metal Men are revealed to have been deactivated around the time the Justice League was fighting CADMUS. It is revealed by an elderly Bruce Wayne that Doc Magnus was "recruited" by Project Cadmus, who tried to force him to build an army of Metal Men to destroy the Justice League. Magnus had seen it coming and preemptively deactivated his creations, breaking their bodies down into simple objects he scattered around and their responsometers hidden with people the doctor trusted. Revived by the anarchist Rebel-1 and her Undercloud organization in their combined Alloy form, the Metal Men were forced to rampage against their will until the new Batman, Terry McGinnis and his friend Max were able to disrupt the control frequency and allow the Metal Men to restore themselves. When Bruce revealed their creator's fate, the Metal Men wondered what to do with themselves until Bruce told them they could continue Magnus' plans for them to protect the people of Earth, even providing them with the Injustice Gang's old satellite base to use as a home.

In the DC vs Marvel crossover that briefly merged the two universes into Amalgam Comics, two comics featuring characters based on the Metal Men were released; Magneto and the Magnetic Men #1 and The Magnetic Men featuring Magneto #1.

Collected editions

In other media

Television
 Due to the success of The Superman/Aquaman Hour of Adventure from the 1960s, Filmation planned to produce pilots for multiple DC heroes, with one of the concept drawings featuring the Metal Men. Those plans were cancelled when CBS secured the animation rights to Batman in the wake of ABC's recent success with the Batman live-action television series at the time.
 The Metal Men and their combined Alloy form appear in Batman: The Brave and the Bold, with Gold voiced by Lex Lang, Lead by Bill Fagerbakke, Platinum by Hynden Walch, Mercury by Corey Burton, Iron by Brian Bloom, and Tin by Dee Bradley Baker.
 The Metal Men appear in a self-titled segment of DC Nation Shorts, with Gold and Lead voiced by Tom Kenny, Platinum and Tin by Hynden Walch, and Mercury and Iron by Corey Burton.

Film
 The Metal Men make a cameo appearance in Justice League: The New Frontier.
 Alternate universe versions of the Metal Men appear in Justice League: Gods and Monsters, with Platinum voiced by Grey DeLisle and Tin again by Dee Bradley Baker while the rest are silent. Platinum appeared in the form of Tina Magnus while Tin serves as Will Magnus' butler and three unnamed Metal Men were designed to mimic Superman, Batman, and Wonder Woman's powers.
 The Metal Men appear in DC Super Hero Girls: Intergalactic Games, with Lead voiced by Khary Payton, Iron by Greg Cipes, and Platinum again by Grey DeLisle.
 In 2012, Barry Sonnenfeld was in talks with Warner Bros. to make a live-action film about the Metal Men. The film was listed as part of the DC Extended Universe as of October 2021. 
 A separate animated Metal Men film is currently in development, with John Musker and Ron Clements directing, producing, and writing the film of Walt Disney Animation Studios movies with DreamWorks Animation's How to Train Your Dragon Trilogy producer Bonnie Arnold and Space Jam: A New Legacy writer Celeste Ballard, for Warner Bros., Warner Animation Group, DC Entertainment and IMAX Entertainment.

Video games
Platinum appears in Lego Batman 3: Beyond Gotham.

Music
The lyrics to an early collaboration between Frank Zappa and Captain Beefheart have been traced to the Metal Men. Beefheart, improvising the lyrics to a jam session (later released as "Metal Man Has Won His Wings"), found an issue of the comic book hanging on a bulletin board in the studio, and used passages from the story and an advertisement for an upcoming release of Hawkman as lyrics.

References

External links
 Metal Men at Don Markstein's Toonopedia. Archived from the original on February 17, 2016.
 Metal Men sales figures for 1964–1968 at The Comics Chronicles
 Cosmic Teams: Metal Men

 
Comics characters introduced in 1962
1962 comics debuts
DC Comics robots
DC Comics superhero teams
DC Comics titles
Characters created by Robert Kanigher
Characters created by Ross Andru